South Coast Group 7 Rugby League (or Group 7 Rugby League for simplicity) is the divisional boundary drawn from the Southern Illawarra and South Coast regions (from the town of Warilla south to Ulladulla) of New South Wales, Australia and is governed by the NSWCRL. The main semi-professional competition, (named South Coast Group 7 VB First Grade for sponsorship reasons), comprises ten (10) teams from across the region. Group 7 Rugby League also administers reserve grade, third grade, and under-18s competitions, Ladies League Tag, as well as looking over many junior competitions.

Clubs
The following twenty clubs compete in South Coast Group 7 competitions, with ten teams in the first-grade competition, seven clubs competing in lower grades and three clubs being junior standalone clubs.
Due to the COVID-19 pandemic in Australia the commencement of 2020 season was postponed. Matches began on 25 July.

Ten clubs, including Mt Warrigal and Milton-Ulladulla, also field Women's League Tag teams. This competition has been running since 2010, and has comprised two divisions since 2018.

Sussex Inlet and Wreck Bay had fielded third-grade teams in 2019, but have not entered a team in 2020. Kiama, who fielded a Ladies League Tag team from 2010 to 2019, have not done so in 2020.

Foundation clubs
Of the original eight teams that competed in the inaugural competition in 1914, only four teams remain playing in first grade. They are the Berry Magpies, Gerringong Lions, Jamberoo Superoos, and Kiama Knights. The Nowra Warriors were also a foundation club, but due to financial reasons were forced to merge with the Bomaderry Swamp Rats in 2007. The merger created the team Shoalhaven Jets, which was renamed Nowra-Bomaderry Jets in 2012.

New teams
There have been a few teams to expand into the Group 7 Rugby League First Grade Premiership. Through the 20s–30s Albion Park were founded, joined the Illawarra Rugby League and returned to Group 7 in 1933. The Shellharbour Sharks are known to have joined the league at this time. Milton-Ulladulla Bulldogs also joined from Group 16 Rugby League. The Warilla-Lake South Gorillas were first introduced into first grade during the 1970s and in 1978 the Batemans Bay Tigers were another team to move from Group 16.

Former teams

Also the following lower-grade teams:
 Albion Park Outlaws (Third Grade 1998–2010, 2014–18, 2022)
 Crookhaven Magpies
 Port Kembla Blacks 2013 to 2017 (Formally Illawarra Rugby League competition 1914 to 2008)
 Pyree (22 seasons between 1920 and 1954)
 Wreck Bay United Bears (Contested in third grade in 1977–88, 1993–97, 1999–2005, 2014–18, 2021)

Clubs timeline 
The graph below shows the participation of all current and most former clubs. The club's highest grade in a particular year is displayed. The source is a compilation of competition tables, point scores and lists of participating teams. These have been taken from the Kiama Independent, Illawarra Mercury and other past newspapers on Trove and microfilm. The current South Coast Group 7 Official Historian has assisted with the provision of more recent tables as printed in association guidebooks and the South Coast Register. Further research may add seasons the juniors only clubs participated which are currently not shown.

History

Formative years
Rugby league has been played in the South Coast region of New South Wales since 1913, with the first competition taking place between teams from the Shoalhaven district. In May 1914, with other rugby clubs from across the region also splitting from rugby union to join the new code, the South Coast Rugby League was formed. The first season of what is now known as the Group 7 competition began with eight teams competing. These teams included: Berry, Bombo, Gerringong, Jamberoo, Kiama, Kangaroo Valley, Naval College, and Nowra. The First round began on 30 May 1914, with Kiama defeating Gerringong 6–3, Naval College defeating Bombo 7–5, Jamberoo Superoos defeating Kangaroo Valley 3–0, and Nowra Warriors defeating Berry Magpies 3–0. The inaugural premiers were Gerringong, winning the final 11–10 at the Kiama Showground. As soon as the league began, they entered a two-year hiatus due to World War I. No competitions were held between 1916 and 1917. When the competition reformed in 1918, Gerringong again won the title. The Nowra Warriors were the next team to win the title in 1919.

1920s
Gerringong went on to win the title a third time in 1920, with a 3–0 win over Jamberoo. During 1925–26, some of the northern teams moved into Illawarra Rugby League competition, including Gerringong, who took out the Illawarra Premiership in 1925. Jamberoo won the premiership in 1927. As a result, they were the first team to represent the South Coast in the first championship between South Coast and Illawarra Premiers. Jamberoo (South Coast) defeated Port Kembla (Illawarra) 15–11. In 1929, Bombo won their first (and only) premiership.

1930s
After winning their first premiership in 1929, Bombo merged with Kiama in 1930. The new entity, Bombo-Kiama, took out the title in their first season. They followed this up with another in 1933. Albion Park became re-affiliated with South Coast Rugby League in 1933. Milton-Ulladulla joined the league in the 1930s from Group 16 Rugby League. Between 1935 and 1937, the Berry Magpies won the premiership three years consecutively. Junior aged competitions (U-17's, 18's, 19's) were first introduced in 1938. The Shellharbour Sharks won their first premiership in 1939.

1940s
Again, the competition faced a hiatus, this time between 1942 and 1943, due to World War II. Albion Park won their maiden Premiership in 1944. Kiama (as a single entity) won the title in 1945. They went on to win a further three titles, becoming the first and only club to win four consecutive titles (1945–1948).

1950s–1960s
For a second time, between 1952 and 1954, Berry record premiership wins three years consecutively. In 1955, the league was renamed Group 7 Rugby League. Shellharbour won the Premiership in 1962 after a 23-year drought. In 1967, Bomaderry record their first premiership win.

1970s–1980s
In the 1970s, an expansion occurred when Warilla entered the first grade competition in 1970. They go on to win their first premiership in 1978. The Batemans Bay Tigers win their first premiership in 1979, after joining one year earlier in 1978 from Group 16. In 1980, the league was re-branded as South Coast Group Seven. Milton-Ulladulla record their first premiership win in 1987.

Modern times
A hat-trick of premierships is again recorded, this time by the Albion Park-Oak Flats Eagles between 1998 and 2000.

Source: Group 7 Rugby League History

Premierships

First-grade premiers
Tip: To view original newspaper articles on matches up to 1954, hover over the blue number in the Reports column and then click on the article name. That will open the article in Trove.

Total premierships won

 Bold denotes clubs which are still active in the first-grade competition.

First grade

Reserve grade

Regan Cup (third grade)

Under 18s

Women's League Tag Division 1

Women's League Tag Division 2

See also

Rugby League Competitions in Australia

References

External links
 South Coast Group 7 Webpage
 Country Rugby League Webpage

South Coast (New South Wales)
Sport in Wollongong
Rugby league competitions in New South Wales
Professional sports leagues in Australia